Milan Popović (born 23 September 1990) is a Montenegrin handball player who plays for CSA Steaua București and the Montenegrin national team.  He was one of the best players EHF European league season 2020/2021.

References

1990 births
Living people
Montenegrin male handball players
Sportspeople from Cetinje
Mediterranean Games competitors for Montenegro
Competitors at the 2018 Mediterranean Games